From Shopgirl to Duchess is a 1915 British silent drama film directed by Maurice Elvey and starring A. V. Bramble, Gertrude Evans and Fred Groves.

Cast
 A. V. Bramble - Gilbert Spate
 Gertrude Evans - Lady Delamere
 Fred Groves - Duke of St. Baynum
 M. Gray Murray - Lard Camperdown
 Pauline Peters - Girl
 Elisabeth Risdon - Sylvia Gray
 Hilda Sims - Gertrude Haynes
 Dolly Tree - Tilly
 Jack Webster

References

External links

1915 films
British silent feature films
1915 drama films
1910s English-language films
Films directed by Maurice Elvey
British drama films
British black-and-white films
1910s British films
Silent drama films